The List of shipwrecks in 1789 includes some ships sunk, wrecked or otherwise lost during 1789.

January

1 January

6 January

8 January

13 January

17 January

18 January

24 January

Unknown date

February

4 February

24 February

Unknown date

March

3 March

7 March

22 March

28 March

30 March

Unknown date

April

11 April

24 April

30 April

Unknown date

May

26 May

Unknown date

June

17 June

Unknown date

July

4 July

11 July

28 July

29 July

Unknown date

August

8 August

24 August

Unknown date

September

8 September

9 September

13 September

18 September

19 September

24 September

29 September

30 September

Unknown date

October

1 October

8 October

12 October

13 October

15 October

20 October

30 October

31 October

Unknown date

November

7 November

12 November

Unknown date

December

5 December

15 December

21 December

24 December

Unknown date

Unknown date

References

1789